Dương Thị Vân (born 20 September 1994) is a Vietnamese footballer who plays as a midfielder for Women's Championship club Than Khoáng Sản and the Vietnam women's national team.

International goals
.''Scores and results are list Vietnam's goal tally first.

References

1994 births
Living people
Women's association football midfielders
Vietnamese women's footballers
Vietnam women's international footballers
21st-century Vietnamese women